Kjeldahl may refer to:

 Johan Kjeldahl (1849–1900), Danish chemist
 Kjeldahl method, analytical chemistry method for determining total nitrogen